Peter Donnelly (born 1959) is an Australian mathematician.

Peter Donnelly may also refer to:

 Peter F. Donnelly (1938–2009), American theatre producer
 Peter Donnelly (artist), artist based in New Zealand
 Peter Donnelly (Australian footballer) (1891–1957), Australian rules footballer
 Peter Donnelly (footballer, born 1936), English footballer
 Peter Donnelly (footballer, born 1965), English footballer
 Peter Donnelly (judoka) (born 1951), British judoka
 Pete Donnelly (baseball), baseball player
 Pete Donnelly (ice hockey) (born 1948), American ice hockey player
 Pete Donnelly (musician) (born 1972), American musician